Agave palmeri (also known as Palmer's century plant) is an especially large member of the genus Agave, in the family Asparagaceae.

Description
Agave palmeri is the largest Agave species growing in the United States. The buds are purplish.

Distribution and habitat
The plant is native to southern Arizona, southwestern New Mexico, Sonora and Chihuahua. It can be found in dry, rocky areas.

Cultivation
The plant is frequently cultivated as an ornamental in other regions. It requires a large pot but is very tolerant of a wide range of conditions, including temperatures of around –10 °C.

Uses
The plant was used by Native Americans for food, drink, fiber, soap, medicine and to make lances.

References

External links

palmeri
Flora of the Chihuahuan Desert
Flora of the Sonoran Deserts
Flora of Arizona
Flora of Chihuahua (state)
Flora of New Mexico
Flora of Sonora
Plants described in 1875
Taxa named by George Engelmann
Garden plants of North America
Drought-tolerant plants